Gary Kinder (born October 25, 1962) is a U.S. Olympian who participated in the 1988 decathlon. Kinder made the team by finishing first in the 1988 Olympic trials in a PR 8293pts. Kinder finished 12th in the 1987 World Championships of track and field with 8030 points beating teammate Rob Muzzio by 13 points.

Kinder, 6'1" 190 lbs, attended the University of Mississippi (Ole Miss) and was coached by (still) head coach Joe Walker. He transferred to the University of New Mexico and finished 2nd at the 1985 NCAA championships in the decathlon. 
Kinder still holds Ole Miss school records in the decathlon (7565 pts.) and javelin (old style-224'3"). He stands 5th on the list in the pole vault with 16' 1/4". Kinder also remains the decathlon record holder at the University of New Mexico where he scored 7965 in placing second in the 1985 NCAA Track and field Championships.

Kinder first appeared on the U.S. list in 1985 with a #6 ranking and had reached as high as #2 in 1988. Kinder was ranked in the top 10 United States Decathletes continuously from 1985 through 1990. His finishes at the U.S. championships are as follows:
1985: 6th 7654 (w)
1986: 3rd 7857
1987: 3rd 8053 berth in 1987 World Championships.
1988: 1st 8293 Olympic team member
1989: 3rd 8155 (w)
1997: 12th 7695
Kinder currently stands as #96 on the World all-time list in decathlon with his 8293.

In June 1991, Kinder was suspended for a doping violation by the governing body of U.S.A. track and field, for two years. However, the ruling was immediately overturned by an arbitration panel of USA Track and Field when flaws in the testing protocol were discovered in this case. Kinder went on to compete in the 1992 Olympic Trials as well as 2 more United States Decathlon Championships.

He coached high school track and field at Brentwood, Tennessee and is founder of KinderSport.

He also served coaching stints at The University of New Mexico and University of Virginia.

References

1962 births
Living people
American male decathletes
Olympic track and field athletes of the United States
Ole Miss Rebels men's track and field athletes
New Mexico Lobos men's track and field athletes
Virginia Cavaliers track and field coaches
New Mexico Lobos track and field coaches
Place of birth missing (living people)
Athletes (track and field) at the 1988 Summer Olympics